James Moberg (born April 16, 1994) is an American former soccer player who previously played for Real Monarchs in the USL Championship.

Career

College
Moberg spent his entire college career at the University of Washington between 2012 and 2015, tallying ten goals and 21 assists in 69 appearances.

While at college, Moberg played in the Premier Development League with Washington Crossfire and Portland Timbers U23s.

Professional
On January 19, 2016, Moberg was selected in the third round (50th overall) of the 2016 MLS SuperDraft by Vancouver Whitecaps FC. However, he instead signed with Real Monarchs, the United Soccer League affiliate of Real Salt Lake, on April 20, 2016.

On October 25, 2021, Moberg announced retirement from professional soccer after spending six years with Real Monarchs.

References

External links

1994 births
Living people
American soccer players
Association football midfielders
North Carolina FC players
People from Windsor, California
Portland Timbers U23s players
Real Monarchs players
Soccer players from California
Sportspeople from the San Francisco Bay Area
USL Championship players
USL League Two players
Vancouver Whitecaps FC draft picks
Washington Crossfire players
Washington Huskies men's soccer players